Broklandsau is a small river of Schleswig-Holstein, Germany. It flows into the Eider near Kleve.

See also
List of rivers of Schleswig-Holstein

Rivers of Schleswig-Holstein
Rivers of Germany